Dice Kayek is a Paris-based high fashion brand founded by the Turkish sisters Ece and Ayşe Ege in 1992. Ece Ege is the creative director of the brand and Ayşe Ege is the manager of the company.

Background 

In 1992, Esmod Paris graduate Ece Ege created a collection of 15 white poplin shirts that attracted the attention of a number of key people in the fashion industry. The following year, together with sister Ayşe Ege, they continued to expand the white shirt collection  with new designs.

In 1993, Dice Kayek presented for the first time a complete women’s ready-to-wear collection in Paris, to critical acclaim. In an October 1993 article, Women’s Wear Daily commented: "Their gauzy poet blouses and coats with bows have found a quick following here among the fashion romantics, especially considering that this was their first runway show."

That same year, Ece Ege also became the Artistic Director of the Japanese fashion house Hanae Mori. The following year, she received the ‘Femme en Or’ fashion award.

In 2004, Dice Kayek joined forces with the Ayaydın-Miroglio Group to create the Turkish contemporary ready-to-wear brand Machka, and Ece Ege was named creative and artistic director of the brand.

In 2010, the France-Euro-Mediterranean Association presented Ece Ege with the ‘Female Achievement Award’ for Dice Kayek’s noteworthy contribution to fostering creative and cultural links between the French, European and Turkish cultures.f

Around the same time, as part of an exhibition to celebrate the year of Turkey in France at the Musée des Arts Décoratifs, Paris, Dice Kayek showed their Istanbul Contrast collection, which focused on significant symbols of Istanbul’s diverse cultural history. The collection was lauded by top international fashion critics. Vogue Italia's Elisa Pervinca Bellini,  noted: "In the embroideries and details, in the silhouettes and lines of the two sisters’ collection there is a strong focus on the lights, the symbols and the allure of old Constantinople." Istanbul Contrast later became a traveling exhibition, and was shown at the Istanbul Modern Museum (Turkey, 2010) and the Amsterdam Museum (Netherlands, 2011). 2011 was also the year Dice Kayek opened two pop-up retail shop, one at Les Galeries Lafayette (Paris) and one at Fenwick  (London).

In 2013, to coincide with the Salone del Mobile 2013 in Milan, the Turkish design firm Demirden Design invited six designers, among them Matthew Lehanneur, Arik Levy and Dice Kayek, to create a work out of Turkish marble, to be unveiled in an exhibition titled ‘Bathing in Light’. For the project, Ece and Ayşe Ege created an exceptional installation called Nebula, which integrated the marble into the idea of a minimalist, light-filled Turkish bath.

More recently, Dice Kayek has been shortlisted for the third edition of the Victoria and Albert Museum ’s Jameel Prize. Three Couture pieces from their Istanbul Contrast collection will be on display at the museum from December 11, 2013 to April 21, 2014.

Dice Kayek, the winner of the third Jameel Prize, had been announced on December 10, 2013 during the launch of the exhibition at the Victoria and Albert Museum. The three Dice Kayek pieces, along with the works of all the other finalists, will be exhibited until April 21, 2014; the show will then travel to other museums around the world.

For video coverage of the Jameel Prize, visit:
http://www.vam.ac.uk/content/exhibitions/exhibition-jameel-prize/jameel-prize-3/

See also

Rodarte

References

External links 
 
 
 France24: Ece Ege, between East and West
FASHION INSIDER |url=http://www.thefashioninsider.com/2015/07/15/dice-kayek-haute-couture-fall-winter-201516/

Clothing companies of France